Randall Cemetery is a historic cemetery in Freeport, Maine, United States. Located at the corner of Lower Main Street (U.S. Route 1) and Desert Road, it contains seventeen headstones, the earliest dating to 1831. The small plot is surrounded by pine trees both in and around its low rock wall.

The cemetery was part of the Randall family farm, run by Isaac (1770–1850) and Mercy Randall (1776–1840), a site now occupied by a Shaw's grocery store. The farm house and buildings were on the Shaw's side of the street, then a dirt track, while a barn stood on the opposite side of today's Lower Main Street. All the buildings were demolished when construction on the ramps to and from Interstate 295 began.

References

External links 

 Randall Cemetery at Find A Grave

Cemeteries in Cumberland County, Maine
Protected areas of Cumberland County, Maine
19th-century establishments in Maine
Buildings and structures in Freeport, Maine